Haydar Zafer (1916 – 1994) was a Turkish wrestler. He competed in the men's freestyle middleweight at the 1952 Summer Olympics.

Wrestling career
Haydar Zafer grew up in Bolu and started Turkish oil wrestling there as a teenager. After 1945, he also pursued Olympic wrestling. He preferred the free style, but also wrestled in the Greco-Roman style. In 1949 he joined the Turkish national team, where he was coached by Nuri Boytorun. In 1951 he competed in his first international championship in Helsinki and immediately became world champion in the middleweight, free style. Since at that time there were much fewer international title fights than today, Haydar Zafer could also participate in only three international championships.

At the 1952 Olympic Games in Helsinki, he could not prevail in the middleweight division. After three victories, he lost on points to the Iranian Gholam Reza Takhti, whom he had defeated in the 1951 world championship, and finished 5th.

At the 1955 World Championships in Karlsruhe, he competed in the Greco-Roman style in the light heavyweight division, but did not get beyond 11th place.

After leaving active wrestling, he worked as a coach at Haliç Wrestling Club. He was married and had three children.

References

External links
 

1916 births
1994 deaths
People from Düzce
Turkish male sport wrestlers
Olympic wrestlers of Turkey
Wrestlers at the 1952 Summer Olympics
World Wrestling Championships medalists
World Wrestling Champions